Mobbar is a Local Government Area of Borno State, Nigeria. Its headquarters are in the town of Damasak.
 
It has an area of 2,790 km and a population of 116,654 at the 2006 census.

The postal code of the area is 602.

It is one of the sixteen LGAs that constitute the Borno Emirate, a traditional state located in Borno State, Nigeria.

Business:

Mobbar shares boundaries with the republic of Niger, as a result most agricultural commodities such as fish, pepper and tomato are exported through her border.

Tourism: The san-san dunes is situated in the outskirts of the local government which will be an amazing site of tourism if further developed.

Politics:

Mobbar is a birthplace to prominent leaders and politicians among the notable ones are; former Governor of Borno State late Alh. Mohammed Goni, former military Administrator Late. Brig.Gen. Abba Kyari rtd, Sen. Abubakar Kyari, senator representing Borno North senatorial district. It is also a home to political gladiators  such as Alh. Aliyu Kyari, Alh. Gambo Lawan, Umar Kareto and many more who have tirelessly worked to transform Mobbar, Borno and Nigeria at large.

References

Local Government Areas in Borno State